Stella Ikupa Alex (born 1 October 1979), is a Tanzanian accountant and politician, who is a member of the ruling Chama Cha Mapinduzi (CCM) party. She is the current Deputy Minister in the office of the Prime Minister of Tanzania, responsible for the disabled. She also serves as a Member of Parliament, having been appointed to a special seat in 2015.

Background and education
She was born on 1 October 1979. She attended "Minazi Mirefu Primary School", in Dar es Salaam, Tanzania's largest city and business hub, graduating in 1994. From 1995 until 1998, she attended Jangwani Girls Secondary School, also in Dar es Salaam for her O-Level studies. She stayed on at Jangwani for her A-Level education, graduating in 2001.

In 2002, she was admitted to the Tanzania Institute of Accountancy, at its Dar es Salaam campus, to pursue an Advanced Diploma in Accountancy, graduating in 2005. Later, from 2009 until 2011, she successfully  pursued a Master of Science degree in Accountancy and Finance, at the Dar es Salaam campus of Mzumbe University.

Work history
In 2007, she began work in the Tanzania Ministry of Energy and Minerals as an accountant, serving in that capacity until 2014. That year, she was transferred to the Tanzania Ministry of Industry and Trade, as an accountant, serving there until 2015.

Political career
Stella Alex has been an active political operative in her community, in the ruling Cama Cha Mapiduzi political party, dating back to 2003. From then until 2015, she served as the treasurer of her local party branch. In 2013, she served as a member of the CCM District Constitutional Council.In 2015, she became a member of parliament under the special seat provision.

On 7 October 2017, president John Magufuli appointed her Deputy Minister,  in the Office of the Prime Minister, responsible for the disabled.

See also
Stella Martin Manyanya

References

External links
Website of the Office of the Prime Minister of Tanzania

Living people
1979 births
Tanzanian accountants
Deputy government ministers of Tanzania
Tanzanian MPs 2015–2020
Mzumbe University alumni
Chama Cha Mapinduzi MPs
Chama Cha Mapinduzi politicians
Women government ministers of Tanzania
Members of the National Assembly (Tanzania)